John Edward Aitchison (27 December 1928 – 2 April 2009) was an English cricketer. He was a right-handed batsman and a slow left-arm bowler who played for Kent County Cricket Club. He was born in Gillingham, Kent in 1928.

Aitchison was taken on to the ground staff at Kent in 1946, living with an aunt in Whitstable. He made his debut for the Kent Second XI later in the year before playing for the county Second XI in the 1947 Minor Counties Championship. Aitchison did not play throughout 1948 when he was posted on National Service in Germany. He made his first-class cricket debut just three days after his first Second XI appearance of 1949, playing against Glamorgan at Gravesend. He took all three of his first-class wickets on his debut.

Aitchison played two further matches for Kent's First XI in July 1950 against Worcestershire and Leicestershire, as well as continuing to play for the county's Second XI. He was described by Derek Ufton, a contemporary on the Kent ground staff, as "a left-arm bowler with a beautiful action". He died at Sydenham in South London in 2009 aged 80.

References

External links

1928 births
2009 deaths
English cricketers
Kent cricketers
People from Gillingham, Kent